This is a list of French television related events from 1961.

Events
18 February - Jean-Paul Mauric is selected to represent France at the 1961 Eurovision Song Contest with his song "Printemps, avril carillonne". He is selected to be the sixth French Eurovision entry during a national final.
18 March - The 6th Eurovision Song Contest is held at the Palais des Festivals et des Congrès in Cannes. Luxembourg wins the contest with the song "Nous les amoureux" performed by Jean-Claude Pascal.

Debuts

Chambre noire 
13 December - Les Coulisses de l'exploit (1961-1972)

Television shows

1940s
Le Jour du Seigneur (1949–present)

1950s
Cinq colonnes à la une
Discorama
Magazine féminin (1952-1970)
Lectures pour tous (1953-1968)
La Piste aux étoiles (1956-1978)
Voyage sans passeport (1957-1969)

1960s
La Tête et les Jambes (1960-1978)

Ending this year
Le Club du jeudi (1950-1961)

Births
2 April - Marie-Ange Nardi, television presenter
5 December - Annie Pujol, television presenter

See also
1961 in France
List of French films of 1961

Deaths